Jodi Glenda Willis-Roberts, OAM (born 24 April 1967) is a visually impaired Australian Paralympic athlete and goalballer.

Biography

Willis-Roberts was born in the Melbourne suburb of Preston. She first competed at the 1988 Seoul Paralympics with the Australia women's national goalball team, when it finished seventh. She moved to athletics and at the 1990 World Championships and Games for the Disabled in Assen, Netherlands, she won a bronze medal in the women's shot put B2. At the 1992 Barcelona Paralympics, she won a gold medal in the Women's Shot Put B2 event, for which she received a Medal of the Order of Australia, and a silver medal in the Women's Discus B2 event; she also competed in the national goalball team, which came seventh, and the Women's Javelin B1>3 – event. In 1995, she competed in the World Championships for powerlifting. In the 1996 Atlanta Olympics, she won a silver medal in the F10-11 shot put and also competed in the F10-11 discus throw. In 2000, she won an Australian Sports Medal. That year, she competed in her home country in the 2000 Sydney Paralympics where she won a gold medal in the F12 shot put and a bronze in the discus throw. At the 2004 Athens Games, she won a bronze medal in the Women's Shot Put F12 event and competed in the Women's Discus F13 – event. She also competed in the 2008 Beijing Olympics where she won a bronze medal in the women's F12-13 shot put event. After the Beijing Games, she had a shoulder reconstruction and tore her left hamstring off the bone at a training camp. In 2011, she was part of the Australian national goalball team that finished sixth at the IBSA Goalball World Cup.

In 1999, she was an Australian Institute of Sport Athletes with a Disability scholarship holder. In 2014, she lived in Bundaberg, Queensland.

References

External links
 
 
 

Paralympic athletes of Australia
Paralympic goalball players of Australia
Goalball players at the 1988 Summer Paralympics
Athletes (track and field) at the 1992 Summer Paralympics
Goalball players at the 1992 Summer Paralympics
Athletes (track and field) at the 1996 Summer Paralympics
Athletes (track and field) at the 2000 Summer Paralympics
Athletes (track and field) at the 2004 Summer Paralympics
Athletes (track and field) at the 2008 Summer Paralympics
Medalists at the 1992 Summer Paralympics
Medalists at the 1996 Summer Paralympics
Medalists at the 2000 Summer Paralympics
Medalists at the 2004 Summer Paralympics
Medalists at the 2008 Summer Paralympics
Paralympic gold medalists for Australia
Paralympic silver medalists for Australia
Paralympic bronze medalists for Australia
Visually impaired shot putters
Visually impaired discus throwers
Visually impaired javelin throwers
Paralympic shot putters
Paralympic discus throwers
Paralympic javelin throwers
Australian blind people
Sportswomen from Victoria (Australia)
Athletes from Melbourne
Female powerlifters
Australian Institute of Sport Paralympic track and field athletes
Recipients of the Medal of the Order of Australia
Recipients of the Australian Sports Medal
1967 births
Living people
Paralympic medalists in athletics (track and field)
Australian female shot putters
Australian female javelin throwers
Australian female discus throwers
People from Preston, Victoria